The Blank Theatre Company is a non-profit theatre company located in Los Angeles, California.

History

Founded in 1990 by current Artistic Director/Co-Artistic Producer Daniel Henning, The Blank's mission is to produce either premieres or "reinventions" of previously produced material.

In 1992, the theatre began an annual Nationwide Young Playwrights Festival, which has provided an outlet for the creative efforts of over 200 playwrights aged nineteen and younger. Notable alumni of the festival include Pulitzer Prize nominee and 2016 Tony winner for The Humans, Stephen Karam and Jake in Progress creator Austin Winsberg.

The Blank also produces the "Living Room Series", a workshop series of mostly new works. The series culminates in a Monday night performance and is presented nearly every Monday night from Labor Day to Memorial Day.  The LRS has developed 600 new plays over the past 25+ years. Many of the scripts have gone on to receive productions and accolades at venues including Manhattan Theatre Club, Laguna Playhouse and Brideswell Theatre in London. In fact, The Explorer's Club by Nell Benjamin went on to win the NY Outer Critics Circle Award for Outstanding New Off-Broadway Play, A Singular They by Aliza Goldstein won the Ted Schmitt Award for World Premiere of an Outstanding New Play, and Heads by EM Lewis won the Francesca Primus Prize.

In April 1996, the company moved to its current home at the 53-seat 2nd Stage Theatre in Hollywood, California, at 6500 Santa Monica Blvd.

Awards

The Blank Theatre Company has received numerous Los Angeles theater awards, including six Los Angeles Drama Critics Circle Awards and three LA Weekly Awards.

Personnel
Daniel Henning - Artistic Director/Producer
Noah Wyle - Artistic Producer

Notable alumni

Ed Asner
Amber Benson
Nicholas Brendon
Warren Davis
Eliza Dushku
Susan Egan
Sarah Michelle Gellar 
Alyson Hannigan

Sally Kellerman 
James Kerwin
Richard Kind
Ricki Lake
Matthew Lillard
Allison Mack
James Marsters
Debra Messing

Molly Shannon
Sherri Shepherd
Kate Shindle
Bruce Vilanch
Gedde Watanabe
Mae Whitman
Noah Wyle
Constance Zimmer

Mainstage productions

The Tragedy of JFK (as told by Wm. Shakespeare) (World Premiere) 2016
Set Up and Punch (World Premiere) 2009
The Jazz Age (West Coast Premiere) 2009
Speech and Debate (West Coast Premiere) 2008
Little Fish (West Coast Premiere) 2007
Heads (World Premiere) 2007
Missouri Waltz (World Premiere) 2007
Hotel C'est L'Amour (World Premiere) 2006
Lobster Alice (Los Angeles Premiere) 2006
A Hole in the Wall (West Coast Premiere) 2006
The Wild Party (West Coast Premiere) 2005 
The Book of Liz (Los Angeles Premiere) 2005
Les Liaisons Dangereuses 2005
American Way (World Premiere) 2004
As Is 2004
Funny... (2 World Premieres) 2003
Fill in the Blank (World Premiere) 2003
Sanguine (World Premiere) 2003
Who's Afraid of Virginia Woolf? 2002
First Lady Suite (West Coast Premiere) 2002

Precious Sons (West Coast Premiere) 2000
The Why (World Premiere) 2000
A Night Out With Young Playwrights (2 World Premieres) 1999
Starr Struck: A Musical Investigation (World Premiere) 1999
Hello Again (West Coast Premiere) 1998
Loot 1997Sky's End (World Premiere) 1996Breaking the Code (L.A. premiere) 1996Young Playwrights Mainstage 95 (3 World Premieres) 1995Chess (L.A. Premiere) 1995The Cradle Will Rock (Off Ramp Theatre) 1994Gertrude Stein and A Companion (L.A. Premiere) 1994In Stitches (World Premiere) 1994Isn't It Romantic? 1993The Fantasticks 1993A Snake in the Vein (West Coast Premiere) 1993Sexual Perversity in Chicago / Hills Like White Elephants 1991The Winter's Tale 1991Hosanna'' 1990

References

External links
 Official website

Theatre companies in Los Angeles
Regional theatre in the United States